HNU may refer to:

Universities 
 Harbin Normal University, in Heilongjiang, China
 Hangzhou Normal University, in Zhejiang, China
 Hefei Normal University, in Anhui, China
 Holy Name University, in Tagbilaran, Bohol, Philippines
 Holy Names University, in Oakland, California, United States
 Huanggang Normal University, in Hubei, China
 Hunan University, in HuNan, China
 Hainan University, in Haikou, Hainan, China

Other uses 
 Phong language, spoken in Vietnam and Laos